The 1949 Campeonato Profesional was the second season of Colombia's top-flight football league. The tournament was started on April 25. 14 teams compete against one another and played each weekend. This tournament was famous for mark the beginning of El Dorado. Millonarios and Deportivo Cali, both with 44 points, played two final matches to decide the champion of the season. Santa Fe, the defending champion, was 3rd with 39 points.

Background
The season was notable for being the beginning of El Dorado, during which many international football stars arrived to the Colombian league, especially from Argentina, due to the protests that were taking place in that country. The tournament began on 25 April 1949. The debutants teams were Atlético Bucaramanga, Boca Juniors de Cali, Deportivo Barranquilla, Deportivo Pereira and Huracán de Medellín. This year Universidad returned to Bogotá. Deportivo Barranquilla participated to replacing Atlético Junior, who was representing Colombia in the South American Championship. Barranquilla only played 21 of the 26 league matches.

League system
Every team played two games against each other team, one at home and one away. Teams received two points for a win and one point for a draw. If two or more teams were tied on points, places were determined by goal difference. The team with the most points is the champion of the league.

Teams

a Municipal played its home games at Itagüí

Final standings

Results

Final

Top goalscorers

Source: RSSSF.com Colombia 1949

References

External links
Dimayor Official Page

Prim
Colombia
Categoría Primera A seasons